Heidi Lee is a Couture Hat fashion designer who was born in Flushing, Queens, New York. She grew up living in Philadelphia, Pennsylvania. She became interested in fashion when she was six years old. She went to school for graphic design at the Rhode Island School of Design. Lee focuses on hats and headwear as a form of conceptual art as well as fashion elements. Her work has been featured in Vogue, Visionaire, Dazed and Confused, MTV, New York Times, New York Magazine, and The Creators Project. Her works have been exhibited at the Kentucky Derby Museum, MOSI Museum's “3D Printing the Future”, and MAD Museum MAD Biennial: 100 Makers that manifest the cultural capital of NYC.” Some of her clients include Anne Hathaway, Madonna, Lady Gaga, Missy Elliott, and Lauryn Hill. She currently runs her own fashion brand called H E I D I L E E, and teaches fashion classes at New York University School of Professional Studies.

Lee received a B.F.A. and B.G.D. in graphic design from Rhode Island School of Design in 2005. Lee garnered the Metropolitan Museum of Art Costume Institute Accessory Design Award in 2012 for her Cocktail Parasol Hat and Parasol Skeleton Hat designs. Her work was featured on the runway for Silicon Valley Fashion Week 2016.

References

External links 
Heidi Lee's Adjunct Faculty page at NYU

Year of birth missing (living people)
Living people
Artists from New York City
American fashion designers
American women fashion designers
Rhode Island School of Design alumni
American milliners
21st-century American businesswomen
21st-century American businesspeople